Simone Iacoponi (born 30 April 1987) is an Italian professional footballer who plays as a right back for Serie D club Roma City.

Career
Iacoponi made his professional debut for Empoli on 20 May 2007 in a 3–3 draw with Reggina.

On 11 February 2022, Iacoponi signed with Teramo until 30 June 2024.

On 17 December 2022, after having been without a contract since July following Teramo's exclusion from Italian football, Iacoponi signed for Serie D club Roma City.

Career statistics

References

External links
Gazzetta Dello Sport Player Profile

1987 births
Living people
People from Pontedera
Sportspeople from the Province of Pisa
Italian footballers
Association football defenders
Serie A players
Serie B players
Serie C players
Serie D players
Empoli F.C. players
A.C. Monza players
A.S.D. Città di Foligno 1928 players
F.C. Südtirol players
Virtus Entella players
Parma Calcio 1913 players
S.S. Teramo Calcio players
A.S.D. Roma City F.C. players
Footballers from Tuscany